Crash Deluxe is a postcyberpunk novel by science fiction author Marianne de Pierres and is the third and final Parrish Plessis Novel.

2005 novels
2005 science fiction novels